Walter Martínez may refer to:

 Walter K. Martinez (1930–1986), New Mexico politician
 Walter Martínez (journalist) (born 1941), Venezuelan journalist
 Walter Martínez (sport shooter) (born 1967), Nicaraguan sport shooter
 Walter Martínez (footballer, 1982-2019), Honduran football forward
 Walter Martínez (footballer, born 1991), Honduran football midfielder